Towers Karpoš IV Tower I is a building, tied for second tallest building in North Macedonia. It is located in the Karpoš municipality of Skopje. Towers Karpoš IV Tower I stands at 19 storeys.

See also
Towers Karpoš IV Tower II
Towers Karpoš IV Tower III
List of tallest buildings in North Macedonia

Buildings and structures in Skopje